Carlisle College is a further education college serving the post 16 education and training needs of Carlisle, England, and the surrounding area. The college, located in Carlisle city centre has more than 2,700 students enrolled each year.

In April 2017 Carlisle College merged with NCG.

Courses 

Carlisle College offer a range of further and higher education, professional qualifications, apprenticeships and community programmes, from entry level to Degrees.

Over 100 courses are available at Carlisle College from Sport, Music and Performing Arts, Health & Social Care or Public Services.

Higher Education 

The subject areas are based on local market needs and include; Accounting, Business, Leadership & Management, Computing, Engineering and Teacher Training.

Ofsted

In November 2016 Ofsted confirmed that Carlisle College continues to be a GOOD provider.

 Ofsted Inspection Report

Apprenticeships 

Carlisle College have apprenticeship programmes to meet specific company requirements.

Redevelopment 

In 2014, The college built a new £5.3m "digital-and-creative-arts complex" which opened at the former Strand Road drill hall.

The next phase of development at Carlisle College will see the opening of a new £1 million Advanced Manufacturing Centre (AMC).

References

Education in Carlisle, Cumbria
Further education colleges in Cumbria
Buildings and structures in Carlisle, Cumbria